Loïc Prud'homme (born 19 August 1969) is a French politician representing la France Insoumise. He was elected to the French National Assembly on 18 June 2017, representing Gironde's 3rd constituency.

See also
 2017 French legislative election

References

1969 births
Living people
Deputies of the 15th National Assembly of the French Fifth Republic
La France Insoumise politicians
People from Bègles
Politicians from Nouvelle-Aquitaine
Deputies of the 16th National Assembly of the French Fifth Republic